Physick may refer to:

An archaic term for a laxative, or for the practice of medicine generally, in pre-modern medicine
Emlen Physick Estate, Victorian house museum in Cape May, New Jersey, located at 1048 Washington Street
Hill-Keith-Physick House in Philadelphia, Pennsylvania, was a home of Philip Syng Physick
Philip Syng Physick (1768–1837), American physician born in Philadelphia, called "father of American surgery"
The Physick Book of Deliverance Dane, the first novel written by Katherine Howe